Fabián Sánchez may refer to:

 Fabian Sanchez (dancer) (born 1988), Colombian dancer
 Fabián Sánchez (footballer, born 1988), Paraguayan football striker
 Fabián Sánchez (footballer, born 2001), Argentine football left-back

See also
 Fabien Sanchez (born 1983), French track cyclist